New Town is a district of Luton, just south east of the town centre, in the Luton district, in the ceremonial county of Bedfordshire, England. It is roughly bounded by Castle Street and London Road to the west, Seymour Road to the East, New Town Street to the North, and Cutenhoe Road to the south.

Local area
Castle Street was the site of a medieval castle. The district has characteristic pubs and has traditionally been a working class area of the town. To alleviate the housing shortage of the 1960s several multi-story flats were built and an industrial park was added in the 1980s to attract new industries. The ring road, which passes nearby, was created at the same time to ease traffic congestion from the M1 motorway to the ever expanding Luton Airport.

Politics 
New Town is part of South ward, which is represented by Cllr David Agbley (Labour), Cllr Fatima Begum (Labour) and Cllr Javeria Hussain (Labour).

The ward forms part of the parliamentary constituency of Luton South and the MP is Rachel Hopkins (Labour).

Local newspapers
Two weekly newspapers cover New Town, although they are not specific to the area. 

They are the:
 Herald and Post
 Luton News

Local Attractions

References

Areas of Luton